Robert Clark "Bob" Gresham (born July 9, 1948) is a former American football running back in the National Football League. He played for the New Orleans Saints, the Houston Oilers, and the New York Jets. He was selected in the 1971 NFL Draft out of West Virginia.

External links
Stats from databasefootball.com

1948 births
Living people
People from Jefferson County, Alabama
Players of American football from Alabama
American football running backs
West Virginia Mountaineers football players
New Orleans Saints players
Houston Oilers players
New York Jets players